Spurlock may refer to:

People
 Spurlock (surname)

Places
 Bear Creek (Red Bird River tributary), location of Spurlock post office
 Hugh L. Spurlock Generating Station, a power plant in Maysville, Kentucky
 Spurlock Museum, in Urbana, Illinois

See also
 Spurlockville, West Virginia
 Harlan, Kentucky, whose post office was named Spurlock during the Civil War